Low Islets may refer to:

 Low Islets (Prime Seal Group), Tasmania
 Low Islets (Tasmania)